The 1967 Indian general election polls in Tamil Nadu were held for 39 seats in the state. The result was a huge victory for Dravida Munnetra Kazhagam, led by C.N. Annadurai and its ally Swatantra Party, led by C. Rajagopalachari. Madras was the first and one of few states, where a non-Congress Party won more seats than Congress in a state. A huge wave of anti-incumbency factor was present in Madras, 1967, which led to the defeat of the popular leader K. Kamaraj and his party in both the state and national elections, won by DMK and its allies.  After this election, the DMK supported the Congress party under Indira Gandhi.

Voting and results

Results by Alliance

List of Elected MPs

See also 
Elections in Tamil Nadu

Bibliography 
Volume I, 1967 Indian general election, 4th Lok Sabha

External links
 Website of Election Commission of India
 CNN-IBN Lok Sabha Election History

1967 Indian general election
Indian general elections in Tamil Nadu